"Till Then" is a popular song written by Eddie Seiler, Sol Marcus, and Guy Wood and published in 1944.

Background
The song was a plea (presumably by a soldier, off to fight the war) to his sweetheart to wait for him until he could get back home. Like many war-themed songs, it enjoyed great popularity when it came out in 1944.

1944 recordings
Two versions by The Mills Brothers and the Les Brown orchestra, respectively, dominated the charts. The recording by The Mills Brothers was released by Decca Records as catalog number 18599. It first reached the Billboard magazine Best Seller chart on September 21, 1944, and lasted three weeks on the chart, peaking at No. 8 (a two-sided hit, backed by "You Always Hurt the One You Love"). It also topped the R&B charts.

Recorded versions
The song has continued to be popular, with versions recorded in later years by artists such as:
Laurindo Almeida
James Brown (1964)
Les Brown and His Orchestra (1944)
The Classics' 1963 version reached No. 20 on the Hot 100 chart and No. 7 on the Middle-Road Singles chart.
Sammy Davis Jr. (1960)
Geraldo and His Orchestra (1944)
Sonny Til & The Orioles (1954)
Leslie Hutchinson (1944)
Norman Luboff Choir
Al Martino
A recording by The Hilltoppers was released in 1954 by Dot Records as catalog number 15132. It first reached the Billboard Best Seller chart on January 23, 1954, and spent eleven weeks on the chart, peaking at No. 10.
Ray Peterson (1960)
Ruby & The Romantics
Hank Thompson
Chester Zardis
Michael Bublé
Dean Martin
Pat Boone
Ringo Starr (1970)
Peter Tork (2011)
The Lettermen
The Four Preps
Geoff Castellucci (2022)

Popular culture
The Mills Brothers' version of the song was featured on an episode of the TV show The Others entitled "Till Then" (April 29, 2000, Season 1 – Episode 10).
The Mills Brothers' recording of the song can be heard in Millennium episode "Matryoshka", which starred Lance Henriksen and first aired on 19 February 1999.
The Mills Brother's version of the song can be heard in Don't Look Up.

References

1944 songs
Songs of World War II
Songs written by Sol Marcus
Songs written by Guy Wood